Hein Potgieter (born 20 September 1982) is a South African rugby union player, currently playing with the . His regular position is lock.

Career
After 9 appearances in the 2006 Vodacom Cup, he joined the  where he made 16 appearances in the 2007 Vodacom Cup and 2007 Currie Cup competitions.

He then joined Italian Super 10 team Catania, making 4 appearances in the 2007–2008 season.

After just one season, he returned to South Africa and joined the  where he played his rugby in 2009.

References

South African rugby union players
Living people
1982 births
Rugby union players from Port Elizabeth
Falcons (rugby union) players
SWD Eagles players
Rugby union locks